The 2012 UCI Women's Road Rankings is an overview of the final UCI Women's Road Rankings, based upon the results in all UCI-sanctioned races of the 2012 women's road cycling season.

Summary

Individual World Ranking (top 100)

Source

UCI Teams Ranking
This is the ranking of the UCI women's teams from 2012.

Source

Nations Ranking (top 50)

Source

References

2012 in women's road cycling
UCI Women's Road World Rankings